Baringhup West is a locality in the Mount Alexander Shire, Central Highlands and Goldfields, Victoria, Australia.

References 

Suburbs of Bendigo
Bendigo